Deh Shoeyb or Deh-e Shoeyb may refer to:
Deh Shoeyb, Ravar
Deh Shoeyb, Zarand